Jotindra Nath Roy was an Indian politician. He was elected as MLA of Goalpokhar Vidhan Sabha Constituency in West Bengal Legislative Assembly in 1991, 1996 and 2001. He died on 23 April 2019 at the age of 84.

References

1930s births
2019 deaths
Communist Party of India (Marxist) politicians
West Bengal MLAs 1991–1996
West Bengal MLAs 1996–2001
West Bengal MLAs 2001–2006